March 4 - Eastern Orthodox liturgical calendar - March 6

All fixed commemorations below are observed on March 18 by Orthodox Churches on the Old Calendar.

For March 5th, Orthodox Churches on the Old Calendar commemorate the Saints listed on February 20 (February 21 on leap years).

Saints

 Martyr Conon of Isauria (1st century)
 Martyr Nestor, father of Martyr Conon of Isauria.
 Martyr Onisius (Onesimus) of Isauria, by beheading (1st century)
 Saint Theophilus, Bishop of Caesarea in Palestine (200)
 Martyr Conon the Gardener, of Pamphylia (251)
 Martyrs Archelaus, Kyrillos, Photios, Virgin-martyr Irais (Rhais) of Antinoë, and 152 Martyrs in Egypt (ca. 308)
 Venerable Conon of Cyprus (4th century)
 Martyr Eulogius of Palestine.
 Martyr Eulampius of Palestine, by the sword.
 Venerable Mark the Ascetic of Egypt (Mark the Athenian, Mark the Faster) (5th century)
 Saint Hesychius the Faster, of Bithynia (790)  (see also: March 6)

Pre-Schism Western saints

 Saint Oliva of Brescia, martyred in Brescia in the north of Italy, under the Emperor Hadrian (138)
 Saint Eusebius, born in Cremona in Italy, he became an abbot in Bethlehem and took part in the struggle against Origenism.
 Saint Eusebius and Companions, a group of ten martyrs who suffered in North Africa.
 Saint Piran (Pyran, Kerrian), monk of Perranporth (c. 480)
 Saint Colman of Armagh, a disciple of St Patrick in Ireland (5th century)
 Saint Kieran of Saighir (Ciaran, Sen-Chiaráin = the Elder Ciarán), Munster (c. 530)  
 Saint Carthage the Elder, the successor of St Kieran as Bishop of Ossory in Ireland (ca. 540)
 Saint Caron, the church at Tregaron in Dyfed in Wales is dedicated to him.
 Saint Virgilius of Arles, Archbishop of Arles (610)
 Saint Clement, Abbot of Santa Lucia in Syracuse in Sicily (ca. 800)

Post-Schism Orthodox saints

 Saints Basil (1249) and Constantine (1257), princes of Yaroslavl.
 Monk-martyr Adrian, Abbot of Poshekhonye (1550), and his fellow-ascetic St. Leonidas (1549)
 New Martyr John the Bulgarian, at Constantinople (1784)
 New Hieromartyr Parthenius, Bishop of Didymoteichon in Thrace (1805)  (see also: March 15 - Greek) 
 New Martyr George of Rapsani, at Larissa (1818) 
 Saint Nikolai (Velimirovich), Bishop of Ohrid and Žiča, Serbia (1956)

New martyrs and confessors

 New Hieromartyr Nicholas Pokrovsky (1919)
 New Hieromartyr John Mirotvortsiev (1938)
 New Hieromartyr Theophan (Grafov), Hierodeacon, of Borisoglebsk Monastery, Vladimir (1938)
 New Hieromartyr Mardarius (Isaev), Hieromonk, of Yurievskoe, Yaroslavl, (1938)

Other commemorations

 Icon of the Mother of God "the Teacher" (or "Education" or "Nurtured Up-Bringing").
 Translation of the relics (1463) of St. Theodore, Prince of Smolensk and Yaroslavl (1299), and his children Saints David (1321) and Constantine (c. 1322)
 Repose of Metropolitan Cornelius of Novgorod (1698)

Icon gallery

Notes

References

Sources
 March 5/March 18. Orthodox Calendar (PRAVOSLAVIE.RU).
 March 18 / March 5. HOLY TRINITY RUSSIAN ORTHODOX CHURCH (A parish of the Patriarchate of Moscow).
 March 5. OCA - The Lives of the Saints.
 The Autonomous Orthodox Metropolia of Western Europe and the Americas (ROCOR). St. Hilarion Calendar of Saints for the year of our Lord 2004. St. Hilarion Press (Austin, TX). p. 19.
 March 5. Latin Saints of the Orthodox Patriarchate of Rome.
 The Roman Martyrology. Transl. by the Archbishop of Baltimore. Last Edition, According to the Copy Printed at Rome in 1914. Revised Edition, with the Imprimatur of His Eminence Cardinal Gibbons. Baltimore: John Murphy Company, 1916. p. 66.
 Rev. Richard Stanton. A Menology of England and Wales, or, Brief Memorials of the Ancient British and English Saints Arranged According to the Calendar, Together with the Martyrs of the 16th and 17th Centuries. London: Burns & Oates, 1892. p. 102.
Greek Sources
 Great Synaxaristes:  5 ΜΑΡΤΙΟΥ. ΜΕΓΑΣ ΣΥΝΑΞΑΡΙΣΤΗΣ.
  Συναξαριστής. 5 Μαρτίου. ECCLESIA.GR. (H ΕΚΚΛΗΣΙΑ ΤΗΣ ΕΛΛΑΔΟΣ). 
Russian Sources
  18 марта (5 марта). Православная Энциклопедия под редакцией Патриарха Московского и всея Руси Кирилла (электронная версия). (Orthodox Encyclopedia - Pravenc.ru).
  5 марта (ст.ст.) 18 марта 2013 (нов. ст.). Русская Православная Церковь Отдел внешних церковных связей. (DECR).

March in the Eastern Orthodox calendar